The Stade Pierre de Coubertin may refer to any of the following venues named after French sports executive Pierre de Coubertin:
 Stade Pierre de Coubertin (Paris)
 Stade Pierre de Coubertin (Cannes)
 Stade Pierre de Coubertin (Lausanne)